The Aisha-Bibi is an 11th or 12th-century mausoleum for a noble woman located in the village of Aisha Bibi,  west of Taraz, Kazakhstan on the Silk Road. It is locally famous as a monument to love and faithfulness.

Design 
According to legend, the mausoleum was built by a Karakhanid Dynasty ruler for his beautiful fiancée Aisha-Bibi, a daughter of Sufi poet Khakim-Ata.  The mausoleum's architectural forms and decoration are reminiscent of fine lace. The whole building is covered with carved terracotta tiles using 60 different floral geometric patterns and stylized calligraphy. Aisha Bibi is a direct stylistic descendant of Samanid Mausoleum in Bukhara.

Site 
Aisha Bibi is part of a larger complex.  Ten meters away is a second mausoleum called Babaji Khatun ("wise queen"), and across the road is a sacred limestone cavern.  Together with a garden area and parking lot they form the national monument.
The complex is sited on a ridge overlooking the Taraz oasis from the west.

Typology
The entire mausoleum is covered with terracotta panels which help to create the illusion of masslessness typical in Islamic architecture.  The terracotta decoration also uses light and shadow rather than color, a pre-Mongol style. Functionally, this type of decoration scatters the light so the viewer is not blinded as he might be from a smooth light colored wall in full sun. The Columns on the corner are shaped after wooden columns used extensively in Soghdian pre-Islamic architecture.  There is a band of calligraphy at the point of constriction in each column.  In general they describe the beauty of Aisha Bibi and of love in general. One of the old distichs reads: "Autumn... Clouds... The Earth is beautiful".

Materials
Sauran clay was used to make the bricks in both the original and restored Aisha Bibi.

History

Current use
The site has been venerated since the Middle Ages. Local women from the Taraz Oasis still pray for children and a happy family. It is customary for newlyweds in Taraz to have their union blessed by the dead lovers. Their ritual reenacts the myth. After the ceremony the wedding party retraces Karakhan's journey from Taraz to the site of his fiancée's death. The journey begins at Karakhan Mausoleum in Taraz and ends at the Aisha Bibi, at each location the bride and groom venerate the dead lovers and ask for their blessing.

Russian archeologist V. V. Bartold was the first scientist to record and study the ruins in 1893.  The Soviet Union built a protective glass shell to preserve the monument (c 1960) and used it for the education of students in Taraz and tourism. In 2002, the Republic of Kazakhstan paid Nishan Rameto to restore the Aisha Bibi and built the park infrastructure around it. Shoqan Walikhanov painted monument in his work in 1856.

Images

See also 

 Samanid mausoleum

Notes

References

Further reading 

Buildings and structures completed in the 12th century
Mausoleums in Kazakhstan
Buildings and structures completed in the 11th century
Jambyl Region
Central Asia